The Book of Joshua (Tiberian: Sēp̄er Yŏhōšūaʿ) is the sixth book in the Hebrew Bible and the Christian Old Testament, and is the first book of the Deuteronomistic history, the story of Israel from the conquest of Canaan to the Babylonian exile. It tells of the campaigns of the Israelites in central, southern and northern Canaan, the destruction of their enemies, and the division of the land among the Twelve Tribes, framed by two set-piece speeches, the first by God commanding the conquest of the land, and, at the end, the second by Joshua warning of the need for faithful observance of the Law (torah) revealed to Moses.

Almost all scholars agree that the Book of Joshua holds little historical value for early Israel and most likely reflects a much later period. The earliest parts of the book are possibly chapters 2–11, the story of the conquest; these chapters were later incorporated into an early form of Joshua likely written late in the reign of king Josiah (reigned 640–609 BCE), but the book was not completed until after the fall of Jerusalem to the Neo-Babylonian Empire in 586 BCE, and possibly not until after the return from the Babylonian exile in 539 BCE.

Contents

Structure 
I. Transfer of leadership to Joshua (1:1–18)
A. God's commission to Joshua (1:1–9)
B. Joshua's instructions to the people (1:10–18)
II. Entrance into and conquest of Canaan (2:1–12:24)
A. Entry into Canaan
1. Reconnaissance of Jericho (2:1–24)
2. Crossing the River Jordan (3:1–17)
3. Establishing a foothold at Gilgal (4:1–5:1)
4. Circumcision and Passover (5:2–15)
B. Victory over Canaan (6:1–12:24)
1. Destruction of Jericho (6)
2. Failure and success at Ai (7:1–8:29)
3. Renewal of the covenant at Mount Ebal (8:30–35)
4. Other campaigns in central Canaan. The Gibeonite Deception (9:1–27)
5. Campaigns in southern Canaan (10:1–43)
6. Campaigns in northern Canaan (11:1–15)
7. Summary of lands conquered (11:16–23)
8. Summary list of defeated kings (12:1–24)
III. Division of the land among the tribes (13:1–22:34)
A. God's instructions to Joshua (13:1–7)
B. Tribal allotments (13:8–19:51)
1. Eastern tribes (13:8–33)
2. Western tribes (14:1–19:51)
C. Cities of refuge and levitical cities (20:1–21:42)
D. Summary of conquest (21:43–45)
E. De-commissioning of the eastern tribes (22:1–34)
IV. Conclusion (23:1–24:33)
A. Joshua's farewell address (23:1–16)
B. Covenant at Shechem (24:1–28)
C. Deaths of Joshua and Eleazar; burial of Joseph's bones (24:29–33)

Narrative

God's commission to Joshua (chapter 1) 

Chapter 1 commences "after the death of Moses" and presents the first of three important moments in Joshua marked with major speeches and reflections by the main characters; here first God, and then Joshua, make speeches about the goal of conquest of the Promised Land; in chapter 12, the narrator looks back on the conquest; and in chapter 23 Joshua gives a speech about what must be done if Israel is to live in peace in the land.

God commissions Joshua to take possession of the land and warns him to keep faith with the Mosaic covenant. God's speech foreshadows the major themes of the book: the crossing of the Jordan River and conquest of the land, its distribution, and the imperative need for obedience to the Law. Joshua's own immediate obedience is seen in his speeches to the Israelite commanders and to the Transjordanian tribes, and the Transjordanians' affirmation of Joshua's leadership echoes Yahweh's assurances of victory.

Entry into the land and conquest (chapters 2–12) 

Rahab, a Canaanite woman of the Bible, sets in motion the entrance into Canaan by the Israelites. To avoid repeating failed attempts by Moses to have notable men of Israel predict the success rate of entry into Canaan mentioned in the book of Numbers, Joshua tasks two regular men with entering Jericho as spies. They arrive at Rahab's house and spend the night. The king of Jericho, having heard of possible Israelite spies, demands that Rahab reveal the men. She tells him that she is unaware of their whereabouts, when in reality, she hid them on her roof under flax. The next morning, Rahab professes her faith in God to the men and acknowledges her belief that Canaan was divinely reserved for the Israelites from the beginning. Because of Rahab's actions, the Israelites are able to enter Canaan.

The Israelites cross the Jordan River through a miraculous intervention of God with the Ark of the Covenant and are circumcised at Gibeath-Haaraloth (translated as hill of foreskins), renamed Gilgal in memory. Gilgal sounds like Gallothi, "I have removed", but is more likely to translate as "circle of standing stones". The conquest begins with the battle of Jericho, followed by Ai (central Canaan), after which Joshua builds an altar to Yahweh at Mount Ebal in northern Canaan and renews the Covenant in a ceremony with elements of a divine land-grant ceremony, similar to ceremonies known from Mesopotamia.

The narrative then switches to the south. The Gibeonites trick the Israelites into entering an alliance with them by saying that they are not Canaanites. Despite this, the Israelites decide to keep the alliance by enslaving them instead. An alliance of Amorite kingdoms headed by the Canaanite king of Jerusalem attacks the Gibeonites but they are defeated with Yahweh's miraculous help of stopping the Sun and the Moon, and hurling down large hailstones (Joshua 10:10–14). The enemy kings were eventually hanged on trees. The Deuteronomist author may have used the then-recent 701 BCE campaign of the Assyrian king Sennacherib in the Kingdom of Judah as his model; the hanging of the captured kings is in accordance with Assyrian practice of the 8th century BCE.

With the south conquered the narrative moves to the northern campaign. A powerful multi-national (or more accurately, multi-ethnic) coalition headed by the king of Hazor, the most important northern city, is defeated at the Battle of the Waters of Merom with Yahweh's help. Hazor itself is then captured and destroyed. Chapter 11:16–23 summarises the extent of the conquest: Joshua has taken the entire land, almost entirely through military victories, with only the Gibeonites agreeing to peaceful terms with Israel. The land then "had rest from war" (Joshua 11:23, repeated at 14:15). Chapter 12 lists the vanquished kings on both sides of the Jordan River: the two kings who ruled east of the Jordan who were defeated under Moses' leadership (Joshua 12:1–6; cf. Numbers 21), and the 31 kings on the west of the Jordan who were defeated under Joshua's leadership (Joshua 12:7–24). The list of the 31 kings is quasi-tabular:

the king of Jerusalem, one; the king of Hebron, one;
the king of Jarmuth, one; the king of Lachish, one; (etc.; Joshua 12:10–11).

Division of the land (chapters 13–22) 

Having described how the Israelites and Joshua have carried out the first of their God's commands, the narrative now turns to the second: to "put the people in possession of the land." Joshua is "old, advanced (or stricken) in years" by this time.

This land distribution is a "covenantal land grant": Yahweh, as king, is issuing each tribe its territory. The "Cities of Refuge" and Levitical cities are attached to the end, since it is necessary for the tribes to receive their grants before they allocate parts of it to others. The Transjordanian tribes are dismissed, affirming their loyalty to Yahweh.

The book reaffirms Moses' allocation of land east of the Jordan to the tribes of Reuben and Gad and the half-tribe of Manasseh, and then describes how Joshua divided the newly conquered land of Canaan into parcels, and assigned them to the tribes by lot. Joshua 14:1 also makes reference to the role of Eleazar the priest (ahead of Joshua) in the distribution process. The description serves a theological function to show how the promise of the land was realized in the biblical narrative; its origins are unclear, but the descriptions may reflect geographical relations among the places named.

The wording of Joshua 18:1–4 suggests that the tribes of Reuben, Gad, Judah, Ephraim and Manasseh received their land allocation some time before the "remaining seven tribes", and a 21-member expedition set out to survey the remainder of the land with a view to organising the allocation to the tribes of Simeon, Benjamin, Asher, Naphtali, Zebulun, Issachar and Dan. Subsequently, 48 cities with their surrounding lands were allocated to the Tribe of Levi.

Omitted in the Masoretic Text, but present in the Septuagint, is a statement that:

By the end of chapter 21, the narrative records that the fulfilment of God's promise of land, rest and supremacy over the enemies of the Israelites was complete. The tribes to whom Moses had granted land east of the Jordan are authorized to return home to Gilead (here used in the widest sense for the whole Transjordan district), having faithfully 'kept the charge' of supporting the tribes occupying Canaan.  They are granted "riches… with very much livestock, with silver, with gold, with bronze, with iron, and with very much clothing" as a reward.

Joshua's farewell speeches (chapters 23–24) 
Joshua, in his old age and conscious that he is "going the way of all the earth", gathers the leaders of the Israelites together and reminds them of Yahweh's great works for them, and of the need to love Yahweh. The Israelites are told – just as Joshua himself had been told – that they must comply with "all that is written in the Book of the Law of Moses", neither "turn[ing] aside from it to the right hand or to the left" (i.e. by adding to the law, or diminishing from it).

Joshua meets again with all the people at Shechem in chapter 24 and addresses them a second time. He recounts the history of God's formation of the Israelite nation, beginning with "Terah, the father of Abraham and Nahor, [who] lived beyond the Euphrates River and worshiped other gods." He invited the Israelites to choose between serving the Lord who had delivered them from Egypt, or the gods which their ancestors had served on the other side of the Euphrates, or the gods of the Amorites in whose land they now lived. The people chose to serve the Lord, a decision which Joshua recorded in the Book of the Law of God. He then erected a memorial stone "under the oak that was by the sanctuary of the Lord" in Shechem. The oak is associated with the Oak of Moreh where Abram had set up camp during his travels in this area. Thus "Joshua made a covenant with the people", literally "cut a covenant", a phrase common to the Hebrew, Greek, and Latin languages. It derives from the custom of sacrifice, in which the victims were cut in pieces and offered to the deity invoked in ratification of the engagement.

The people then returned to their inheritance, i.e., their allocated lands.

Closing items 
The Book of Joshua closes with three concluding items (referred to in the Jerusalem Bible as "Two Additions"):
The death of Joshua and his burial at Timnath-serah
The burial of the bones of Joseph at Shechem
The death of Eleazar and his burial in land belonging to Phinehas in the mountains of Ephraim.

There were no Levitical cities given to the descendants of Aaron in Ephraim, so theologians Carl Friedrich Keil and Franz Delitzsch supposed the land may have been at Geba in the territory of the Tribe of Benjamin: "the situation, 'upon the mountains of Ephraim', is not at variance with this view, as these mountains extended, according to Judges 4:5, etc., far into the territory of Benjamin".

In some manuscripts and editions of the Septuagint, there is an additional verse relating to the apostasy of the Israelites after Joshua's death.

Composition

Authorship and date 
The Book of Joshua is an anonymous work. The Babylonian Talmud, written in the 3rd to 5th centuries CE, attributed it to Joshua himself, but this idea was rejected as untenable by John Calvin (1509–64), and by the time of Thomas Hobbes (1588–1679) it was recognised that the book must have been written much later than the period it depicted. There is now general agreement that it was composed as part of a larger work, the Deuteronomistic history, stretching from the Book of Deuteronomy to the Books of Kings, composed first at the court of king Josiah in the late 7th century BCE, and extensively revised in the 6th century BCE.

Historicity 

The prevailing scholarly view is that Joshua is not a factual account of historical events. The apparent setting of Joshua in the 13th century BCE corroborates with the Bronze Age Collapse, which was indeed a time of widespread city-destruction. However, with a few exceptions (Hazor, Lachish), the destroyed cities are not the ones the Bible associates with Joshua, and the ones it does associate with him show little or no sign of even being occupied at the time. The archaeological evidence shows that Jericho and Ai were not occupied in the Near Eastern Late Bronze Age. Ai was first excavated by Judith Marquet-Krause. According to some scholars, the story of the conquest represents the nationalist propaganda of the 8th century BCE kings of Judah and their claims to the territory of the Kingdom of Israel; incorporated into an early form of Joshua written late in the reign of king Josiah (reigned 640–609 BCE). The book was probably revised and completed after the fall of Jerusalem to the Neo-Babylonian Empire in 586 BCE, and possibly after the return from the Babylonian exile in 538 BCE.

In the 1930s Martin Noth made a sweeping criticism of the usefulness of the Book of Joshua for history. Noth was a student of Albrecht Alt, who emphasized form criticism (whose pioneer had been Hermann Gunkel in the 19th century) and the importance of etiology. Alt and Noth posited a peaceful movement of the Israelites into various areas of Canaan, in contradiction to the Biblical account. American archaeologist William F. Albright questioned the "tenacity" of etiologies, which were key to Noth's analysis of the campaigns in Joshua.

Archaeological evidence in the 1930s showed that the city of Ai, an early target for conquest in the putative Joshua account, had existed and been destroyed, but in the 22nd century BCE.  Some alternate sites for Ai, such as Khirbet el-Maqatir or Khirbet Nisya, have been proposed which would partially resolve the discrepancy in dates, but these sites have not been widely accepted. In 1951, Kathleen Kenyon showed that Jericho was from the Middle Bronze Age (c. 2100–1550 BCE), not the Late Bronze Age (c. 1550–1200 BCE). Kenyon argued that the early Israelite campaign could not be historically corroborated, but rather explained as an etiology of the location and a representation of the Israelite settlement.

In 1955, G. Ernest Wright discussed the correlation of archaeological data to the early Israelite campaigns, which he divided into three phases per the Book of Joshua. He pointed to two sets of archaeological findings that "seem to suggest that the biblical account is in general correct regarding the nature of the late thirteenth and twelfth-eleventh centuries in the country" (i.e., "a period of tremendous violence").  He gives particular weight to what were then recent digs at Hazor by Yigael Yadin. Archaeologist Amnon Ben-Tor of the Hebrew University of Jerusalem, who has replaced Yadin as the supervisor of excavations at Hazor since 1990, believes that recently unearthed evidence of violent destruction by burning verifies the Biblical account of the city's conquest by the Israelites. In 2012, a team led by Ben-Tor and Sharon Zuckerman discovered a scorched palace from the 13th century BC in whose storerooms they found 3,400-year-old ewers holding burned crops; however, Sharon Zuckerman did not agree with Ben-Tor's theory, and claimed that the burning was the result of the city's numerous factions opposing each other with excessive force.

In her commentary for the Westminster Bible Companion series, Carolyn Pressler suggested that readers of Joshua should give priority to its theological message ("what passages teach about God") and be aware of what these would have meant to audiences in the 7th and 6th centuries BCE. Richard Nelson explained that the needs of the centralised monarchy favoured a single story of origins, combining old traditions of an exodus from Egypt, belief in a national god as "divine warrior," and explanations for ruined cities, social stratification and ethnic groups, and contemporary tribes.

Manuscripts

Fragments of Joshua dating to the Hasmonean period were found among the Dead Sea Scrolls (4QJosha and 4QJoshb, found in Qumran Cave 4).
The Septuagint (Greek translation) is found in manuscripts such as Washington Manuscript I (5th century CE), and a reduced version of the Septuagint text is found in the illustrated Joshua Roll. The earliest complete copy of the book in Hebrew is in the Aleppo Codex (10th century CE).

Themes

Faith and wrath 
The overarching theological theme of the Deuteronomistic history is faithfulness and God's mercy, and their opposites, faithlessness and God's wrath. In the Book of Judges, the Books of Samuel, and the Books of Kings, the Israelites become faithless and God ultimately shows his anger by sending his people into exile. But in Joshua Israel is obedient, Joshua is faithful, and God fulfills his promise and gives them the land as a result. Yahweh's war campaign in Canaan validates Israel's entitlement to the land and provides a paradigm of how Israel was to live there: twelve tribes, with a designated leader, united by covenant in warfare and in worship of Yahweh alone at a single sanctuary, all in obedience to the commands of Moses as found in the Book of Deuteronomy.

God and Israel 

The Book of Joshua takes forward Deuteronomy's theme of Israel as a single people worshipping Yahweh in the land God has given them. Yahweh, as the main character in the book, takes the initiative in conquering the land, and Yahweh's power wins the battles. For example, the walls of Jericho fall because Yahweh fights for Israel, not because the Israelites show superior fighting ability. The potential disunity of Israel is a constant theme, the greatest threat of disunity coming from the tribes east of the Jordan. Chapter 22:19 even hints that the land across the Jordan is unclean and that the tribes who live there have secondary status.

Land 

Land is the central topic of Joshua. The introduction to Deuteronomy recalled how Yahweh had given the land to the Israelites but then withdrew the gift when Israel showed fear and only Joshua and Caleb had trusted in God. The land is Yahweh's to give or to withhold, and the fact that he has promised it to Israel gives Israel an inalienable right to take it. For exilic and post-exilic readers, the land was both the sign of Yahweh's faithfulness and Israel's unfaithfulness, as well as the centre of their ethnic identity. In Deuteronomistic theology, "rest" meant Israel's unthreatened possession of the land, the achievement of which began with the conquests of Joshua.

The enemy 

Joshua "carries out a systematic campaign against the civilians of Canaan – men, women and children – that amounts to genocide." In doing this he is carrying out herem as commanded by Yahweh in Deuteronomy 20:17: "You shall not leave alive anything that breathes". The purpose is to drive out and dispossess the Canaanites, with the implication that there are to be no treaties with the enemy, no mercy, and no intermarriage. "The extermination of the nations glorifies Yahweh as a warrior and promotes Israel's claim to the land," while their continued survival "explores the themes of disobedience and penalty and looks forward to the story told in Judges and Kings." The divine call for massacre at Jericho and elsewhere can be explained in terms of cultural norms (Israel was not the only Iron Age state to practice herem) and theology (a measure to ensure Israel's purity as well as the fulfillment of God's promise), but Patrick D. Miller in his commentary on Deuteronomy remarks, "there is no real way to make such reports palatable to the hearts and minds of contemporary readers and believers."

Obedience 

Obedience versus disobedience is a constant theme of the work. Obedience ties in the Jordan crossing, the defeat of Jericho and Ai, circumcision and Passover, and the public display and reading of the Law. Disobedience appears in the story of Achan (stoned for violating the herem command), the Gibeonites, and the altar built by the Transjordan tribes. Joshua's two final addresses challenge the Israel of the future (the readers of the story) to obey the most important command of all, to worship Yahweh and no other gods. Joshua thus illustrates the central Deuteronomistic message, that obedience leads to success and disobedience to ruin.

Moses, Joshua and Josiah 
The Deuteronomistic history draws parallels in proper leadership between Moses, Joshua and Josiah. God's commission to Joshua in chapter 1 is framed as a royal installation. The people's pledge of loyalty to Joshua as the successor of Moses recalls royal practices. The covenant-renewal ceremony led by Joshua was the prerogative of the kings of Judah. God's command to Joshua to meditate on the "book of the law" day and night parallels the description of Josiah in 2 Kings 23:25 as a king uniquely concerned with the study of the law. The two figures had identical territorial goals; Josiah died in 609 BCE while attempting to annex the former Israel to his own kingdom of Judah.

Some of the parallels with Moses can be seen in the following, and not exhaustive, list:
 Joshua sent spies to scout out the land near Jericho, just as Moses sent spies from the wilderness to scout out the Promised Land
 Joshua led the Israelites out of the wilderness into the Promised Land, crossing the Jordan River as if on dry ground, just as Moses led the Israelites out of Egypt through the Red Sea, which they crossed as if on dry land
 After crossing the Jordan River, the Israelites celebrated the Passover just as they did immediately before the Exodus
 Joshua's vision of the "commander of Yahweh's army" is reminiscent of the divine revelation to Moses in the burning bush
 Joshua successfully intercedes on behalf of the Israelites when Yahweh is angry for their failure to fully observe the "ban" (herem), just as Moses frequently persuaded God not to punish the people
 Joshua and the Israelites were able to defeat the people at Ai because Joshua followed the divine instruction to extend his sword, just as the people were able to defeat the Amalekites as long as Moses extended his hand that held the staff of God
 Joshua is "old, advanced in years" at the time when the Israelites can begin to settle on the promised land, just as Moses was old when he died having seen, but not entered, the Promised Land
 Joshua served as the mediator of the renewed covenant between Yahweh and Israel at Shechem, just as Moses was the mediator of Yahweh's covenant with the people at Mount Sinai/Mount Horeb.
 Before his death, Joshua delivered a farewell address to the Israelites, just as Moses had delivered his farewell address.
 Moses lived to be 120 and Joshua lived to be 110.

Moral and political interpretations 

The Book of Joshua deals with the conquest of the Land of Israel and its settlement, which are politically charged issues in Israeli society. In her article "The Rise and Fall of the Book of Joshua in Public Education in the Light of Ideological Changes in Israeli Society," Israeli biblical scholar Leah Mazor analyzes the history of the book and reveals a complex system of references to it expressed in a wide range of responses, often extreme, moving from narrow-minded admiration, through embarrassment and thunderous silence to a bitter and poignant critique. The changes in the status of the Book of Joshua, she shows, are the manifestations of the ongoing dialogue that Israeli society has with its cultural heritage, with its history, with the Zionist idea, and with the need to redefine its identity.

David Ben-Gurion saw in the war narrative of Joshua an ideal basis for a unifying national myth for the State of Israel, framed against a common enemy, the Arabs. He met with politicians and scholars such as Biblical scholar Shemaryahu Talmon to discuss Joshua's supposed conquests and later published a book of the meeting transcripts; in a lecture at Ben-Gurion's home, archaeologist Yigael Yadin argued for the historicity of the Israelite military campaign pointing to the conquests of Hazor, Bethel, and Lachish. Palestinian writer Nur Masalha claimed that Zionism had presented the 1948 Arab-Israeli War (which saw the creation of the State of Israel) as a "miraculous" clearing of the land based on Joshua, and the Bible as a mandate for the expulsion of the Palestinians.

The biblical narrative of conquest has been used as an apparatus of critique against Zionism. For example, Michael Prior criticizes the use of the campaign in Joshua to favor "colonial enterprises" (in general, not only Zionism) and have been interpreted as validating ethnic cleansing. He asserts that the Bible was used to make the treatment of Palestinians more palatable morally.  A related moral condemnation can be seen in "The political sacralization of imperial genocide: contextualizing Timothy Dwight's The Conquest of Canaan" by Bill Templer. This kind of critique is not new; Jonathan Boyarin notes how Frederick W. Turner blamed Israel's monotheism for the very idea of genocide, which Boyarin found "simplistic" yet with precedents. In her tenure as Minister of Education, Israeli leftist politician Shulamit Aloni often complained about the centrality of the book of Joshua in the curricula, as opposed to the secondaryness of humane and universal principles found in the Books of the Prophets. Her attempt to change the Bible study program was unsuccessful.

See also 
 The Bible Unearthed
 "The Bible's Buried Secrets"
 Ed (biblical reference)
 Transjordan (Bible)
 Yom HaAliyah

References

Bibliography

External links 

 Hebrew and English text:
 יְהוֹשֻׁעַ Yehoshua–Joshua (Hebrew–English at Mechon-Mamre.org, Jewish Publication Society translation)
 Jewish translations:
 Joshua (Judaica Press) translation with Rashi's commentary at chabad.org
 Christian translations
 Online Bible at GospelHall.org
 Joshua at Wikisource (Authorised King James Version)
  Various versions

 
7th-century BC books
6th-century BC books
Nevi'im
Phoenicians in the Hebrew Bible
Historical books
Deuteronomistic history
Cultural depictions of Joshua